The name Frieda has been used for two tropical cyclones in the Atlantic Ocean.

 Hurricane Frieda (1957) – a minimal hurricane that remained in the open ocean.
 Tropical Storm Frieda (1977) – a weak and short-lived storm that caused moderate rainfall in Belize.

See also 
 List of storms named Freda, a similar name used in the Pacific and Indian oceans

Atlantic hurricane set index articles